Rani Bazar is a Town in Faizabad city in the Indian state of Uttar Pradesh and is Subpost Office of Faizabad.

Demographics
 India census, Rani Bazar had a population of 19,990. Males constitute 51% of the population and females 49%. Rani Bazar has an average literacy rate of 62%, higher than the national average of 59.5%: male literacy is 71%, and female literacy is 52%. In Rani Bazar, 17% of the population is under 6 years of age.

References

Neighbourhoods in Faizabad
Industrial Area in Faizabad